Corrie de Bruin (born October 26, 1976 in Dordrecht, South Holland) is a retired discus thrower and shot putter from the Netherlands, who represented her native country at the 1996 Summer Olympics in Atlanta, United States. There she didn't reach the final, after having thrown 55.48 metres in the qualifying heats.

The younger sister of discus thrower Erik de Bruin, she was Holland's undisputed leading shot putter in the 1990s and played a leading role in discus throwing alongside Jacqueline Goormachtigh as well. De Bruin won the world title in discus throwing at the 1994 World Junior Championships in Athletics.

Achievements

References

  Dutch Olympic Committee
 

1976 births
Living people
Dutch female discus throwers
Dutch female shot putters
Olympic athletes of the Netherlands
Athletes (track and field) at the 1996 Summer Olympics
Universiade medalists in athletics (track and field)
Sportspeople from Dordrecht
World Athletics Championships athletes for the Netherlands
Universiade silver medalists for the Netherlands
Universiade bronze medalists for the Netherlands
Medalists at the 1995 Summer Universiade
Medalists at the 1997 Summer Universiade
20th-century Dutch women